The 2007 Campeonato Ecuatoriano de Fútbol de la Serie A (known as 2007 Copa Pílsener Serie A for sponsorship reasons) was the 49th season of Ecuador's Serie A, the country's top football league. The season began on February 10. LDU Quito won their 9th title.

Format
The format for this season remains the same as the previous season.

The First Stage and Second Stage are identical. The ten teams competed in a double round-robin tournament, one game at home and one away. The top three teams in each stage qualified to the Liguilla Final with bonus points (3, 2, and 1 point[s], respectively). The winner of each group also qualified to the 2007 and 2008 Copa Sudamericana, respectively. At the end of the second stage, the team with the fewest points in the First and Second Stage aggregate table was relegated to the Serie B.

The Liguilla Final was a double round-robin tournament between the six qualified teams of the First and Second Stage. The winner of the Liguilla Final was crowned the Serie A champion. The champion and runner-up also qualified to the 2008 Copa Libertadores into the Second Stage, while the third-place finisher qualified to the First Stage.

Teams
The number of teams remained the same for this season. Aucas was relegated after the Second Stage of the 2006 season. They were replaced by Imbabura, the 2006 Serie B E2 winner, who was making their first appearance in the Serie A.

First stage
The first stage was played between February 1, 2007 and June 13, 2007.

Second stage
The second stage was played between July 15, 2007 and October 7, 2007.

Aggregate table

Liguilla Final
The Liguilla Final was played between October 21, 2007 and December 16, 2007.

Top goalscorers

See also 
 Serie A de Ecuador
 2007 Copa Libertadores
 2007 Copa Sudamericana
 2007 in Ecuadorian football
 Federación Ecuatoriana de Fútbol

External links 
 Federación Ecuatoriana de Fútbol official site 
 2007 season on RSSSF
 Ecuadorian Futbol News

2007
Ecu
Football